Urban Books is a book publisher specializing in African-American topics, founded and published by Carl Weber in 2002.

Imprints
 Urban Soul (women's fiction, a joint venture with Kensington Books)
 Urban Renaissance Books (2010)
 Urban Christian Books (2007)

References
 King Carl: Publisher, bookseller, novelist, family man and—oh, yeah—ladies' man, Felicia Pride, Publishers Weekly, January 9, 2006
 Carl Weber Interview at AuthorsDen, Conversations Magazine, April 26, 2006

External links
 Official website
 Urban Christian
 Q-Boro Books
 Streetfiction.org - Book Reviews and Author Interviews

Small press publishing companies
Book publishing companies of the United States
Publishing companies established in 2002
2002 establishments in the United States